Mireille Robert (born 1 March 1962) is a French politician representing La République En Marche! She was elected to the French National Assembly on 18 June 2017, representing Aude's 3rd constituency.

She lost her seat in the first round of the 2022 French legislative election.

See also
 2017 French legislative election

References

1962 births
Living people
Deputies of the 15th National Assembly of the French Fifth Republic
La République En Marche! politicians
21st-century French women politicians
Place of birth missing (living people)
Women members of the National Assembly (France)